400R can refer to:

Allison World 400R, a transmission built for transit buses by Allison Transmission
Goodyear GA-400R Gizmo, a helicopter developed by Goodyear
Honda XR 400R, an off-road motorcycle produced by Honda
Kawasaki Ninja 400R, a 2011 sport bike manufactured by Kawasaki
Nismo 400R, a special edition variation of the Nissan Skyline R33
Privia PX-400R, a digital piano manufactured by Casio